The Lure of Egypt is a 1921 American silent drama film directed by Howard C. Hickman and starring Robert McKim, Claire Adams and Joseph J. Dowling.

Plot

‘’The Lure of Egypt’’ is an adaptation of the novel ‘’There was a King in Egypt’’, by Norma Lorimer.

Cast
 Robert McKim as Prince Dagmar 
 Claire Adams as Margaret Lampton 
 Joseph J. Dowling as Professor Lampton 
 Carl Gantvoort as Michael Amory
 Maude Wayne as Millient Mervill
 William Lion West as Nishi
 Frank Hayes as Abdul 
 Zack Williams as Theodore 
 Aggie Herring as Mrs. Botts 
 George Hernandez as Mr. Botts 
 Harry Lorraine as Gondo Koro

References

Bibliography
 Munden, Kenneth White. The American Film Institute Catalog of Motion Pictures Produced in the United States, Part 1. University of California Press, 1997.

External links

1921 films
1921 drama films
Silent American drama films
Films directed by Howard C. Hickman
American silent feature films
1920s English-language films
Pathé Exchange films
American black-and-white films
1920s American films
Films with screenplays by Richard Schayer